Olios milleti, is a species of spider of the genus Olios. It is native to India and Sri Lanka. According to SpiderID, Olios milleti is most often sighted outdoors during the month of February.

See also
 List of Sparassidae species

References

Sparassidae
Spiders of the Indian subcontinent
Spiders of Asia
Spiders described in 1901